Jean-Michel Larqué (born 8 September 1947) is a French former professional footballer, and now a sports journalist. He has also been player-coach of RC Paris, his only experience as head-coach.

Career
Larqué was born in Bizanos, Pyrénées-Atlantiques. As a player, Larqué played as a midfielder, and was one of the most important players for AS Saint-Étienne in the 1960s and 70s where he won all his titles. He finished his playing career in Paris with Paris Saint-Germain and RC Paris. He holds the joint–record for most Ligue 1 titles won (seven), along with his Saint-Étienne teammate Hervé Revelli, as well as Thiago Silva and Marco Verratti of Paris Saint–Germain, and Grégory Coupet, Juninho, and Sidney Govou of Lyon.

After having retired as a player, he became a football journalist: redactor for Onze Mondial magazine, but also on the radio Radio Monte Carlo with his programme, Larqué foot and on TV where he is a commentator. Between 1980 and 1984 he commented football matches on Antenne 2 and between 1985 and 2005 on TF1 with Thierry Roland. With the departure of Thierry Roland for M6, TF1 chose Thierry Gilardi (died on 25 March 2008) of Canal + to comment with Larqué. His style is notable for his constant repetition of the same phrase. In 1983, he also created training schools for young footballers from 7 to 19 where came Florent Malouda, Bruno Cheyrou, Benoït Cheyrou and Fabrice Fernandes.

Honours
Saint-Étienne
Division 1: 1966–67, 1967–68, 1968–69, 1969–70, 1973–74, 1974–75, 1975–76
Coupe de France: 1969–70, 1973–74, 1974–75

Orders
Chevalier of the Légion d'honneur: 1999

References

External links

Official site of his training schools (in French "stages")
photo and international career

1947 births
Living people
Sportspeople from Pyrénées-Atlantiques
French footballers
France international footballers
Association football midfielders
AS Saint-Étienne players
Paris Saint-Germain F.C. players
Racing Club de France Football players
Ligue 1 players
Olympic footballers of France
Footballers at the 1968 Summer Olympics
French football managers
Paris Saint-Germain F.C. managers
French sports journalists
Association football commentators
French male non-fiction writers
Chevaliers of the Légion d'honneur
Association football player-managers
Footballers from Nouvelle-Aquitaine